James Henry Rowland Sr. (January 9, 1909 – January 4, 1991) was an American football and basketball coach, college athletics administrator, and lawyer. He served as the head football coach at Bluefield State Teachers College—now known as Bluefield State College—in Bluefield, West Virginia from 1935 to 1940 and Howard University in Washington, D.C. from 1941 to 1942, compiling a career college football coaching record of 24–27–16. Rowland was also the head basketball coach at Bluefield State from 1935 to 1941.

Rowland graduated from William Penn High School in Harrisburg, Pennsylvania and attended Cheyney State Teacher's College—now known as Cheyney University of Pennsylvania—where he played varsity football and basketball and ran track. He then moved on to Ohio State University. There was member a freshmen and reserve football teams and ran track before earning a Bachelor of Science and a Master of Arts in Education. Rowland was grade school principal in Mecklenburg County, Virginia before Bluefield State, where he was also athletic director, boxing coach, and assistant professor.

Rowland later practiced law in Harrisburg and was a member of the Pennsylvania Board of Education.

Head coaching record

Football

References

External links
 

1909 births
1991 deaths
American school principals
Bluefield State Big Blues athletic directors
Bluefield State Big Blues football coaches
Bluefield State Big Blues men's basketball coaches
Cheyney Wolves football players
Cheyney Wolves men's basketball players
Howard Bison football coaches
College boxing coaches in the United States
College men's track and field athletes in the United States
Bluefield State College faculty
Howard University School of Law alumni
Ohio State University alumni
Sportspeople from Harrisburg, Pennsylvania
Coaches of American football from Pennsylvania
Players of American football from Harrisburg, Pennsylvania
Basketball coaches from Pennsylvania
Basketball players from Harrisburg, Pennsylvania
Track and field athletes from Pennsylvania
Educators from Virginia
Pennsylvania lawyers
African-American coaches of American football
African-American players of American football
African-American basketball coaches
African-American basketball players
African-American male track and field athletes
African-American lawyers
20th-century African-American sportspeople